Île-à-la-Crosse Airport  is located  north of Île-à-la-Crosse, Saskatchewan, Canada.

See also 
List of airports in Saskatchewan

References 

Registered aerodromes in Saskatchewan